Alhanwadi is a village in Pathardi taluka, Ahmadnagar district of Maharashtra state in Indian territory.

Geography
The village is located on intersection of Pathardi.

References

Villages in Pathardi taluka
Villages in Ahmednagar district